Bygones is a 1987 Dutch drama film directed by Ine Schenkkan. It is based on the book of the same name of Inez Dullemen. 

The film won the Golden Calf for Best Feature Film award at the 1987 Netherlands Film Festival. Jasperina de Jong also won the Golden Calf for Best Actress for her role in the film.

Plot
A daughter tries to process the slow death of her parents through dementia.

Cast
 Jasperina de Jong as Inez
 Elise Hoomans as Moeder
 Max Croiset as Father

References

External links 
 

1987 films
Dutch drama films
1980s Dutch-language films
1987 drama films